Yazdanfar was an Iranian noble who ruled Qom as a Sasanian vassal. In the late 640s/early 650s, the invading Arabs, who had conquered most of the Sasanian Empire, reached Qum, where Yazdanfar made peace with them, giving them a village to settle in. The reason for his hospitality was that his domain often suffered from raids by the Daylamites, which he hoped would now be defended by the Arabs.

Sources 
 

Year of birth unknown
7th-century deaths
7th-century Iranian people
Vassal rulers of the Sasanian Empire